The historic mining town of Ophir is a home rule municipality governed by a general assembly and is located in San Miguel County, Colorado, United States. Ophir is located two miles from the Ames Hydroelectric Generating Plant, the world's first hydroelectric plant to supply alternating current electricity for an industrial purpose (mining). The population was 159 at the United States Census, 2010 census.

A post office called Ophir was established in 1878. The town was named after Ophir, a place mentioned in the Hebrew Bible.

Geography

Ophir is located at  (37.856049, -107.831167).

Demographics

As of the census of 2000, there were 113 people, 50 households, and 17 families residing in the town. The racial makeup of the town was 97.35% White, 0.88% from other races, and 1.77% from two or more races. Hispanic or Latino of any race were 2.65% of the population.

There were 50 households, out of which 18.0% had children under the age of 18 living with them, 26.0% were married couples living together, 2.0% had a female householder with no husband present, and 66.0% were non-families. 24.0% of all households were made up of individuals, and 2.0% had someone living alone who was 65 years of age or older. The average household size was 2.26 and the average family size was 2.82.

In the town, the population was spread out, with 14.2% under the age of 18, 2.7% from 18 to 24, 65.5% from 25 to 44, 16.8% from 45 to 64, and 0.9% who were 65 years of age or older. The median age was 31 years. For every 100 females, there were 140.4 males. For every 100 females age 18 and over, there were 169.4 males.

The median income for a household in the town was $57,917, and the median income for a family was $81,421. Males had a median income of $37,321 versus $53,750 for females. The per capita income for the town was $33,579. There were no families and 6.1% of the population living below the poverty line, including no under eighteens and none of those over 64.

Climate
Climate type is dominated by the winter season, a long, bitterly cold period with short, clear days, relatively little precipitation mostly in the form of snow, and low humidity.  The Köppen Climate Classification sub-type for this climate is "Dfc" (Continental Subarctic Climate).

Points of interest
 Ames Hydroelectric Generating Plant
 San Juan Skyway National Scenic Byway
 Trout Lake

See also

 List of municipalities in Colorado
 San Juan Mountains

 Araiza, Caroline. 2023. "Ophir Rides out the Slides," Colorado Life, January/February 2023, pp. 52-58.

References

External links
 
 
 CDOT map of the Town of Ophir
 The last passenger train on the Ophir Trestle, September 2, 1951. Accessed 5/30/2020 

Towns in San Miguel County, Colorado
Towns in Colorado